Çayırlı is a district of Erzincan Province, Turkey.

Çayırlı (Turkic: "with meadows") may refer to:

 Çayırlı, Adıyaman, a village in Adıyaman district of Adıyaman Province, Turkey
 Çayırlı, Daday, a village
 Çayırlı, Gölbaşı, a neighborhood of Gölbaşı district of Ankara Province, Turkey
 Çayırlı, Sason, a village in Sason district of Batman Province, Turkey
 Çayırlı, Yenişehir
 Çayırlı, Azerbaijan, a village and municipality in Goychay Rayon, Azerbaijan

See also
 Cəyirli (disambiguation)